"Sometimes" is a song by American singer Britney Spears from her debut studio album, ...Baby One More Time (1999). Written by Jörgen Elofsson and produced by Elofsson himself, Per Magnusson and David Kreuger, the song was released as Spears' second single on April 6, 1999, by Jive Records. "Sometimes" is a bubblegum pop ballad that alludes to a relationship where a shy girl is reserved on expressing feelings to her lover. The song received generally favorable reviews from contemporary critics.

"Sometimes" attained worldwide success, peaking inside the top ten in multiple countries. In the United States, the song peaked at number 21 on the Billboard Hot 100. The song reached number one in Belgium (Flanders), Netherlands and New Zealand, while reaching number two in Australia. In the United Kingdom, the song reached number three, and is also Spears' third best-selling single in the country. An accompanying music video, directed by Nigel Dick, was shot at the Paradise Cove in Malibu, California. It portrays Spears watching her love interest from afar. Spears has performed "Sometimes" in four of her concert tours: the ...Baby One More Time Tour (1999), the (You Drive Me) Crazy Tour (2000), the Oops!... I Did It Again Tour (2000–01), and the Dream Within a Dream Tour (2001–02).

Background
Before recording her debut album, Spears had originally envisioned it in the style of "Sheryl Crow music, but younger [and] more adult contemporary". However, the singer agreed with her label's appointment of producers, who had the objective to reach a teen public at the time. She flew to Cheiron Studios in Stockholm, Sweden, where half of the album was recorded the spring of 1998, with producers Max Martin, Denniz Pop and Rami Yacoub, among others. "Sometimes" was written by Jörgen Elofsson, and produced by Per Magnusson and David Kreuger. Spears recorded the vocals for the song in May 1998, at Cheiron Studios in Stockholm, Sweden. It was also mixed at Cheiron Studios by Martin. Esbjörn Öhrwall played the acoustic guitar, while bass guitar was done by Thomas Lindberg. Keyboards and programming was done by Kreuger, and additional keyboards by Magnusson. Background vocals were provided by Anders von Hoffsten. Spears also co-wrote and recorded a track called "I'm So Curious", produced by Eric Foster White, that was released as a B-side to "Sometimes". The track was recorded in 1997 at 4MW East Studios in New Jersey. "Sometimes" was released as the second single from ...Baby One More Time on April 30, 1999.

Songwriting controversy
The song created controversy over the writing credits. Steve Wallace, an Indiana songwriter, claimed he wrote "Sometimes" in 1990, but did not copyright it until 2003, four years after Spears registered the song's copyright. Wallace claimed Spears confessed he wrote the song, by showing to the court a possible e-mail from the singer, which said, "I now know for a fact that you wrote ['Sometimes']. But there's nothing I can do about it. That's all I can say about it." The e-mail was considered fake and the lawsuit was dismissed on October 31, 2005, when Judge John D. Tinder ruled that the singer did not steal the song.

Composition

"Sometimes" is a romantic bubblegum pop song, with a length of four minutes and four seconds. The song is composed in the key of B major and is set in time signature of common time with a moderately slow tempo of 96 beats per minute. After the bridge, it transposes to B major. Spears' vocal range spans almost two octaves from the low note F3 to the high note E5. The song has a sequence of Cm11–F7sus–B–B(9)/D–F/A–F as its chord progression. Stephen Thomas Erlewine of AllMusic said that "Sometimes" and the album's other hit songs revealed Max Martin's mastery of the pop hook, Eurodance rhythm, and memorable melody.

Lyrically, the song is a "heartbroken ballad", where Spears declares on the introduction, "You tell me you're in love with me / That you can't take your pretty eyes away from me / It's not that I don't wanna stay / But every time you come too close I move away". According to musicologist Melanie Lowe, "Spears shows a different side of her personality [with 'Sometimes'] than she does in her other songs." Both of them also commented the song "lacks rhythmic drive and the backing track is fuller, with smoother and rounder synthesized instruments", while describing Spears' vocals as more natural when compared to "...Baby One More Time" and "(You Drive Me) Crazy".

Critical reception

A reviewer from CD Universe commented that the song "warns a potential love of [Spears'] need for time and patience, rolling along nicely with a slow groove and a big beat". Amanda Murray of Sputnikmusic considered "Sometimes" a competent single, but claimed the song as unremarkable. Kyle Anderson of MTV said that the song "introduces the first sorta-ballad to [...Baby One More Time]", and considered it "reasonable enough, though through three songs, Spears' lyric approach appears to be entirely about guys. Like, she never stops thinking about them". Caryn Ganz of Rolling Stone called "Sometimes" a "further hit" from ...Baby One More Time, along with "From the Bottom of My Broken Heart" and "(You Drive Me) Crazy". Spence D. of IGN considered "Sometimes" a "[Max Martin] glossy grown-up pop" song, while Annabel Leathes of BBC Online said the song "represents the innocent years when Britney annoyed and titillated in equal measure".

Nicholas Hautman, from Us Weekly, deemed it "the epitome of bubblegum pop, a genre that unjustly got a bad rap. Its key change is what dreams are made of". Bustles Alex Kristelis called it "a perfect example of good cheese". While reviewing ...Baby One More Time on its 20th anniversary, Billboards Chuck Arnold felt that "there is a wistful melancholy to this diary entry of a song that digs deeper into the doubts and insecurities below the bubbly surface of both 'Crazy' and the title track". The staff from Entertainment Weekly placed it at number 22 on their ranking of Spears's songs and said that "not quite a ballad, not yet a banger, ['Sometimes'] cemented Britney as pop's good girl of '99". For Daniel Megarry from Gay Times, it was one of the "standout tracks" from ...Baby One More Time and wrote that "it’s impossible not to feel nostalgia when the summery strings of 'Sometimes' grace your eardrums". Nayer Nissim, from Pink News, deemed it one of Spears' "more adult (but not adult) early tracks that drips with '90s singer-songwritery charm". Shannon Barbour from Cosmopolitan opined that it was "cool, but mostly forgettable". During the 2000 BMI Pop Awards, "Sometimes" was honored with the award of Most Performed BMI Song. In 2017, ShortList's Dave Fawbert listed the song as containing "one of the greatest key changes in music history".

Commercial performance
"Sometimes" achieved commercial success worldwide. The song reached number one in Belgium (Flanders), Netherlands and New Zealand, and was certified Gold in the latter by the Recording Industry Association of New Zealand (RIANZ), for selling more than 7,500 physical units of the single. It also peaked at number two in Australia, where it was later certified Platinum by the Australian Recording Industry Association (ARIA), after shipping over 70,000 units, and number four in Finland and Sweden, while reaching the top ten on other five music charts. "Sometimes" was also successful in the United Kingdom. It entered and peaked at number three on the UK Singles Chart on June 26, 1999. According to the Official Charts Company, "Sometimes" is Spears' third best-selling single in the United Kingdom, with sales over 456,000 physical units. In the United States, the song peaked at number 21 on the Billboard Hot 100 on the week of July 24, 1999, while reaching number 11 and 29 on the Adult Contemporary and Adult Pop Songs charts, respectively. Even though the song enjoyed heavy airplay, it was not available physically to spur album sales. It also managed to peak at number six on the Mainstream Top 40 chart. "Sometimes" was also certified Gold by the Syndicat National de l'Édition Phonographique (SNEP), for sales over 250,000 units of the single in France, where it peaked at number 13.

Music video

Spears started rehearsing for the music video for "Sometimes" in February 1999. However, during the rehearsals, the singer injured her knee and was forced to start sessions of physical therapy. A month later, Spears released in a statement: "I want to thank my wonderful fans and all of the people who have offered their love and support during this time," while revealing she wouldn't be able to shoot the music video until April 1999. The music video was later directed by Nigel Dick, who also directed her previous video for Spears' 1998 debut single "...Baby One More Time". It was shot at the Paradise Cove in Malibu, California. The music video was released on May 6, 1999, on Total Request Live.

According to MTV, the initial concept for the music video was to portray Spears on the porch of a beachfront home watching a group of kids having fun, prompting flashbacks about her former boyfriend. However, the video begins with Spears, in a long sleeveless white dress, walking barefoot through a lawn to a telescope, and looking through it. The concept was later changed to a man and a dog walking on the beach, portraying the singer as the girl next door, watching her love interest, played by model Chad Cole, from afar. The beach location was kept, and the music video intercuts with scenes of Spears' dancing on the Paradise Cove pier with her dancers dressed all in beach-friendly white attire, then Spears sits near a car. A writer of Rolling Stone noted the video is best known for "purifying the sexy persona Spears introduced in the '... Baby One More Time' video", while describing it as "a virginal Britney in a long, flowing white dress (and other demure outfits) gazing at a clean-cut boy on the beach, then she walks on the balcony with a pink ball and does some chaste choreography that features her dancers forming a heart while she sings that she only wants to "hold you tight, treat you right." Spears is sitting on a picnic blanket wishing she was there with him. She leaves alone." On February 20, 2012, behind the scenes footage of the music video leaked online.

Track listings

European CD single
"Sometimes" (Radio Edit) – 3:55
"Sometimes" (Soul Solution Mid Tempo Mix) – 3:29

Australian and European CD maxi single
"Sometimes" (Radio Edit) – 3:55
"I'm So Curious" – 3:35
"Sometimes" (Soul Solution Mid Tempo Mix) – 3:29

UK CD maxi single
"Sometimes" (Radio Edit) – 3:55
"Sometimes" (Soul Solution Mid Tempo Mix) – 3:29
"I'm So Curious" – 3:35

Japanese CD maxi single
"Sometimes" (Radio Edit) – 3:55
"...Baby One More Time" (Sharp Platinum Vocal Remix) – 8:11
"...Baby One More Time" (Davidson Ospina Club Mix) – 5:40

Cassette single
"Sometimes" (Radio Edit) – 3:55
"I'm So Curious" – 3:35

2 × 12" vinyl promo, 33 ⅓ RPM
"Sometimes" (Thunderpuss 2000 Club Mix) – 8:02
"Sometimes" (Mike Ski's Drum Dub) – 4:56
"Sometimes" (Soul Solution Mid-Tempo Remix) – 3:29
"Sometimes" (ThunderDUB) – 7:18
"Sometimes" (Mike Ski's 3 AM Bass Bin Destroyer Mix) – 9:34
"Sometimes" (Original Radio Edit) – 3:55
"Sometimes" (Boris & Beck Roxy Dub) – 6:55
"Sometimes" (Beats Of Thunderpuss) – 4:27

Personnel
Credits for "Sometimes" and "I'm So Curious" are taken from the single's liner notes.

Sometimes
 Britney Spears – lead vocals, background vocals
 Jörgen Elofsson – songwriting
 David Kreuger – producer, keyboards, programming
 Per Magnusson – producer, keyboards
 Anders von Hoffsten – background vocals
 Esbjörn Öhrwall – acoustic guitar, guitar
 Thomas Lindberg – bass guitar, bass, guitar
 Max Martin – mixing
 Tom Coyne – audio mastering

I'm So Curious
 Britney Spears – lead vocals, background vocals, songwriting
 Eric Foster White – songwriting, producer, mixing, bass guitar, bass, guitar, keyboards, programming
 Dan Petty – acoustic guitar, guitar
 Tom Coyne – audio mastering

Charts

Weekly charts

Year-end charts

Certifications and sales

Release history

References

Bibliography

1990s ballads
1998 songs
1999 singles
Britney Spears songs
Dutch Top 40 number-one singles
Jive Records singles
Music videos directed by Nigel Dick
Number-one singles in the Czech Republic
Number-one singles in New Zealand
Pop ballads
Songs involved in plagiarism controversies
Songs written by Jörgen Elofsson
UK Independent Singles Chart number-one singles
Ultratop 50 Singles (Flanders) number-one singles